{{DISPLAYTITLE:C7H19N3}}
The molecular formula C7H19N3 may refer to:

 Spermidine, a polyamine compound found in ribosomes and living tissues
 Tris(dimethylamino)methane, the simplest representative of the tris(dialkylamino)methanes of the general formula (R2N)3CH